Jun Hye-sook (born 5 May 1955) is a South Korean politician in the liberal Minjoo Party of Korea, and a member-elect of the National Assembly representing Gwangjin, Seoul. She was previously a party list member of the Assembly from 2008 to 2012.

Before entering politics, she worked as a pharmacist, serving as president of the North Gyeongsang Pharmaceutical Association from 1998 to 2004.

References

External links
 

1955 births
Living people
Members of the National Assembly (South Korea)
Minjoo Party of Korea politicians
21st-century South Korean women politicians
21st-century South Korean politicians
Sungkyunkwan University alumni
Yeungnam University alumni
People from North Gyeongsang Province
Female members of the National Assembly (South Korea)